Demyanenko is a surname of Ukrainian origin. It originates from the name Demyan through an addition of the Ukrainian paternal suffix -enko. Notable people with the surname include:

Aleksandr Demyanenko (1937–1999), Russian film and theater actor
Anatoliy Demyanenko (born 1957), Ukrainian football player and coach
Andrey Demyanenko (born 1984), Belarusian rower
Denys Demyanenko (born 2000), Ukrainian football player
Ivan Demyanenko (born 1989), Uzbek swimmer
Valentin Demyanenko (born 1983), Ukrainian–Azerbaijani flatwater canoeist
Viktor Demyanenko (born 1958), Kazakhstani boxer

See also
 

Ukrainian-language surnames